Vietnam competed at the 2012 Summer Paralympics in London. This was the third participation of Vietnam at the Paralympics after Athens 2004 and Beijing 2008. The country was represented by 11 competitors. The Vietnam team in 2012 comprised: Athletics: Nguyễn Thị Hải, Cao Ngọc Hùng (flagbearer), Trịnh Công Luận. Swimming: Võ Thanh Tùng., Nguyễn Thành Trung, Dương Thị Lan, Trịnh Thị Bích Như. Powerlifting: Nguyễn Thị Hồng, Châu Hoàng Tuyết Loan, Nguyễn Văn Phúc, Nguyễn Bình An.

Athletics 

Men’s Field Events

Women’s Field Events

Powerlifting 

Men

Women

Swimming 

Men

Women

See also
Vietnam at the 2012 Summer Olympics

References

Nations at the 2012 Summer Paralympics
2012
Paralympics